David Alvin Revering (born February 12, 1953) is an American former professional baseball player. He appeared in 557 games as a first baseman, designated hitter and pinch hitter in Major League Baseball from 1978 to 1982 for four American League teams.

Early career
Born in Roseville, California, Revering graduated from Bella Vista High School. He was drafted by the Cincinnati Reds in the seventh round of the 1971 Major League Baseball Draft. The Reds announced a trade in which they would acquire disgruntled Cy Young Award winning pitcher Vida Blue from the Oakland Athletics in exchange for Revering and $1.75 million at the Winter Meetings on December 9, 1977. Commissioner Bowie Kuhn vetoed the transaction on January 30, . A new deal was struck one month later on February 25 when the Reds sent Revering and cash to Oakland for Doug Bair.

Oakland A's
Upon his acquisition, Revering immediately assumed first base duties for the A's, batting .271 with sixteen home runs and 46 runs batted in his rookie season. For his career in Oakland, he batted .279 with 52 home runs and 195 RBIs.

New York Yankees
Revering was traded along with Mike Patterson and minor-league left-handed pitcher Chuck Dougherty from the Athletics to the New York Yankees for Jim Spencer and Tom Underwood on May 20, .

He assumed Spencer's job of backing up Bob Watson at first base. He batted .235 with two home runs and seven RBIs seeing limited action during the strike shortened season, however, he did make the post-season for the only time in his career. He made two appearances in the 1981 American League Division Series as a late inning defensive replacement, but did not have an at-bat. He logged two at-bats in the 1981 American League Championship Series against the A's, collecting a single in the Yankees' 13-3 game two victory. Though the Yankees reached the 1981 World Series, Revering did not make an appearance.

1982-83
A month into the  season, the Yankees dealt Revering to the Toronto Blue Jays, with minor leaguers Tom Dodd and Jeff Reynolds for John Mayberry. In August, the Blue Jays offered Revering the choice of accepting a demotion to the minor leagues or his release; Revering picked the latter on August 2. Shortly afterwards, he signed with the Seattle Mariners; however, he was released at the end of the season. Revering joined the Detroit Tigers for spring training , but did not make the club. He was offered a minor league assignment, but chose to retire instead.

References

External links
, or Sports Illustrated

1953 births
Living people
American expatriate baseball players in Canada
Baseball players from California
Gulf Coast Reds players
Indianapolis Indians players
Major League Baseball first basemen
New York Yankees players
Oakland Athletics players
Seattle Mariners players
Sportspeople from Roseville, California
Tampa Tarpons (1957–1987) players
Toronto Blue Jays players
Trois-Rivières Aigles players